Aesica (with the modern name of Great Chesters) was a Roman fort, one and a half miles north of the small town of Haltwhistle in Northumberland, England. 
It was the ninth fort on Hadrian's Wall, between Vercovicium (Housesteads) to the east and Magnis (Carvoran) to the west. Its purpose was to guard the Caw Gap, where the Haltwhistle Burn crosses the Wall. The B6318 Military Road passes about half a mile to the south of the fort.

Name
During the Roman period the fort was known as Æsica or ESICA 

, but is now known as Great Chesters or Greatchesters, and should not be confused with Chesters (Cilurnum).

Name toponym
The name Æsica may have been derived from the deity Æsus.

If so then the name might be interpreted as: 
 " being of the kind of " Æsus
 " association with " Æsus
 " abounding in " Æsus

Æsus is known to have been associated with water and river systems; the name might have been related to a remarkable aqueduct system that drew water from the Haltwhistle Burn – Caw Burn directly into the fort.

The main purpose of the fort was to guard the Caw Gap created by the  Caw Burn, a tributary of the River South Tyne.

Description
It is believed that the fort was completed in the year 128 AD. Unlike other wall forts that project beyond the Wall, all of Aesica is south of the Wall. The Wall at this point is narrow gauge, but stands next to foundations that were prepared for the broad wall. There was speculation as to why the foundations for the broad wall had not been used to support the wall at this point. In 1939 it was found that Milecastle 43 had already been built in preparation for the broad wall, and it is thought that it was the presence of this milecastle that prevented the north wall of the fort being built on the original foundations. It appears that the milecastle was demolished once the fort had been completed. The east gate and east wall cannot now be traced.

The north-east corner of the fort is now occupied by farm buildings, built over the route of the Wall.

The fort had only three main gates; south, east and west, with double portals with towers. At some time the west gate was completely blocked up. There were towers at each corner of the fort. The Military Way entered by the east gate and left by the west gate. A branch road from the Stanegate entered by the south gate.

The Vallum passed some short distance south of the fort, and was crossed by a road leading from the south gate to the Stanegate. A vicus lay to the south and east of the fort, and several tombstones have been found there.

Roman aqueduct
The fort was supplied with water by a remarkable aqueduct system that drew water from the Haltwhistle Burn – Caw Burn directly into the fort.

Garrison

The 2nd-century garrison was the Sixth Cohort of Nervians, followed by the Sixth Cohort of Raetians. The 3rd-century garrison was the Second Cohort of Asturians with a detachment of Raeti Gaeseti.

Excavations
Excavations were carried out in 1894, during which the ramparts were cleared. The west tower of the south gate was found to contain a hoard of jewellery, which included an enamelled brooch shaped as a hare, a gilded bronze brooch described as a masterpiece of Celtic art, a silver collar with a pendant, a gold ring and a bronze ring with a Gnostic gem. During this excavation the headquarters building (principia) was partially uncovered, together with its vaulted underground strong room. A barrack block was also found to the south-west of the principia.

In 1897 a bathhouse was discovered,  to the south, east of the branch road to the Stanegate. It includes a dressing room, latrine, cold room with cold bath, dry-heat room, warm steamy room and hot steamy room.

References

Notes

Citations

Sources

Bibliography
 J. Collingwood Bruce, Roman Wall  (1863), Harold Hill & Son, 
 Frank Graham, The Roman Wall, Comprehensive History and Guide (1979), Frank Graham,

External links

 AESICA at www.Roman-Britain.co.uk
 AESICA FORT Hadrian's Wall as it exists today

Roman fortifications in England
Roman sites in Northumberland
Forts of Hadrian's Wall
128 establishments
120s establishments in the Roman Empire
2nd-century establishments in Roman Britain